Igor Platonovich Demidov (5 June 1873 – October 20, 1946) was a Russian politician.

A cadet then a member of the State Duma, he went into exile in Paris after the Bolshevik Revolution. He was a member of the editorial staff of the newspaper "Последние новости" ("News"), then its assistant chief editor, and in the early 1920s was also a member of the parish council of St Alexander Nevsky in Paris.

Sources
 State Duma of the Russian Empire, 1906-1917: The Encyclopedia. Moscow: Russian Political Encyclopedia, 2008. С. 158–159.  . S. 158–159. .

1873 births
1946 deaths
Politicians from the Russian Empire
Journalists from the Russian Empire
Place of birth missing
Igor
White Russian emigrants to France